The Darién small-eared shrew (Cryptotis merus) is a species of mammal in the family Soricidae. It is known only from montane regions along the border between Colombia and Darién Province, Panama, where it has been found in rainforest at elevations from 1400 to 1500 m. It has terrestrial habits.

References

Cryptotis
Mammals of Colombia
Mammals of Central America
Mammals described in 1912